I Spy is an American stop-motion/claymation television series that aired on the HBO Family digital pay-TV channel in the United States from December 14, 2002 to September 21, 2003, based on the children's book series created and written by Jean Marzollo and Walter Wick. Produced by The Ink Tank in season 1 and JWL Entertainment Productions in season 2 and Scholastic Media, the show lasted for two seasons and 52 episodes.

Episode format 
 The episode starts off with Spyler (who had a tennis ball head) and CeCe (who looked as though she was made of blocks) trying to find something to do. When they find something, they discover that they need other items. Duck arrives and gives Spyler and CeCe four (or sometimes three) items to find, which she says in a riddle. Spyler and CeCe then start finding for the items. After each item is found they sing their "Whoop! We Found It!"  song. Duck appears again and tells them what they have found and what they need to find in riddle. Spyler also calls for Wheeler to take their items home. After all the items are found, Spyler and CeCe do their activity/task. They always find a use for every item. Each episode also has a super challenge, announced after the episode’s title, involving finding a certain number of a specific object throughout the episode, such as four wingnuts or six triangular blocks.

Characters

 Spyler – Spyler is one of the main characters in I Spy. He is a plasticine clay model, with a tennis ball head, red pipe cleaner hair, green gloves for hands, a pink eraser, and buttons as feet. In every episode of I Spy, Spyler and CeCe find four items, with an exception for "A Broom, a Whistle, and a Drum/"Sky High" where they find three items, that are in every riddle that Duck gives, hence beginning to play the game I spy. The items they find are used for a certain purpose, such as getting rid of CeCe's hiccups in "I Spy a Tick-illy Hiccup", or building a robot in "I Spy a Runaway Robot". While playing I spy, when they find an item, Spyler and CeCe sing their "Whoop! We Found It!" song. Occasionally, when they are carrying other large items and need help doing this, Spyler and CeCe call for Wheeler, their big red dump truck, to carry these items back home.
Gender: Male
Voiced by: Tara Jayne

 CeCe – CeCe is Spyler's best friend and pet dog. Like Spyler, she is made of plasticine clay with orange building blocks and yellow and green paper dots on her. She talks, like Spyler. She has jokes for Spyler when they are around things that are in the game, around things that are not in the game,  around what they use for a purpose and around and in places where the things in the game are.
Gender: Female
Voiced by: Ellen Lee

 Duck – Duck is Spyler and Cece's friend. She is a rubber duck on wheels who gives out things to find for Spyler and Cece.
Gender: Female
Voiced by: Cindy Creekmore

 Wheeler – Wheeler is a big red dump truck. He is called upon every so often to bring items Spyler and Cece can use for their activity back home.
Gender: Male
Voiced by: Big Al

 Domino General – Domino General is the leader of the dominoes who has a white mustache in the front of his face. He talks half indistinctly.
Gender: Male
Voiced by: Big Al

 Mumble Monster – Mumble Monster is a monster that has yellow fur and wears purple, yellow and blue striped socks. He speaks in a mumble voice, hence the title of his name.
Gender: Male
Voiced by: Big Al

 Silly Knights - The knights are people who wear armor and have shields, who live in a sand castle on the beach. In every episode that features them, they always argue over who is better than the rest of them or who is right, like who is the tallest, who is the best singer, etc.
Gender: Males

 Polka and Dot - Polka and Dot are ladybug twin sisters. When Spyler and Cece come by, they ask Polka and Dot if they can borrow a missing item after they find it. Polka and Dot say they cannot "borrow" the item, but they can "have" it.
Gender: Females

 Clankenspy - Clankenspy is a robot made with a tin-can body, a light bulb head, and a red button on the center of him. He was invented by Spyler and Cece in "I Spy a Runaway Robot" to help them clean up a mess they made at the beginning of the episode. He is described as "strong and fast and nice."
Gender: Male

Episode guide

Season 1 (2002-2003)
A Mumble Monster Mystery/CeCe’s Special Scrapbook - (December 14, 2002)
A Bike I Like/A Tick-illy Hiccup - (December 15, 2002) 
A Broom, a Whistle, and a Drum/Sky High - (December 21, 2002)
A Runaway Robot/A Little Lost Lamb - (December 22, 2002)
A Starry Sky/Circus Things in Three Rings - (December 28, 2002)
A Mumble Monster Picture Day/Clouds Rolled By - (December 29, 2002)
A Thing That Flings/Seashells by the Seashore - (January 4, 2003)
Home Run Fun/A Race in a High-Flying Place - (January 5, 2003)
A Mumble Monster Mid-Day Snack/A Polka-Dot Puppet Princess - (January 11, 2003)
A Rockin' Bronco/A Wish for a Fish - (January 12, 2003)
A Bird I've Heard/A Super Silly Pizza - (January 18, 2003)
An Out of Luck Truck/A Kite in Flight - (January 19, 2003)
A Campfire Light Night/Freewheelin' Fun - (January 25, 2003)

Season 2 (2003)
A Mumble Movie/A Book Wherever I Look - (June 29, 2003)
A Surprise Before Your Eyes/Something Nice for the Mice - (July 6, 2003)
A Marble Maze Craze/Toys That Roam - (July 13, 2003)
A Rhyme Just in Time/A Toe-Tapping Talent Show - (July 20, 2003)
Red She Said/One Quick Magic Trick - (July 27, 2003)
A Superhero/A Silly Sleepover - (August 3, 2003)
The Case of the Missing Truck/Something Really Cool - (August 10, 2003)
The Best Car by Far/Something Fit for a Queen - (August 17, 2003)
A Very Merry Musical/A Sled up Ahead! - (August 24, 2003)
A Rundown Robot/A Game That's Not the Same - (August 31, 2003)
A Dinosaur with a Scritch-Scratch Itch/Fun and a Hole-in-One! - (September 7, 2003)
A 'Moo' in Act Two/A Train Back on Track - (September 14, 2003)
Fun in the Jungle/A Squeeze For a Sneeze - (September 21, 2003)

Broadcast 
The show originally aired on HBO Family on December 14, 2002 as part of its Jam (now HBO Kids) preschool block in the United States until it was removed in July 2011, along with the TV show Harold and The Purple Crayon. Qubo later aired this show from May 18, 2013 until September 25, 2015 along with other Scholastic shows the network aired. The show was also on Hulu until 2017. The show aired on Nick Jr. in the UK in 2003 until 2005. The show aired on ABC, as part of its ABC Kids block in Australia from 2003 to 2004.

References

External links 
 

2000s American animated television series
2002 American television series debuts
2003 American television series endings
American children's animated adventure television series
American children's animated education television series
American stop-motion animated television series
American television shows based on children's books
Animated television series about dogs
Clay animation television series
English-language television shows
HBO original programming